Jean-Jules Allasseur (13 June 1818 — 1903) was a French sculptor, a pupil of Pierre-Jean David called David d'Angers at the École des Beaux-Arts, Paris, who produced portrait sculptures, memorial allegories and decorative architectural sculpture for official commissions under the Second Empire. He was made a chevalier of the Legion of Honor, 7 August 1867.

He is buried at the cemetery of Montmartre (14th division) where he kept his studio.

Selected works
La Découverte de Moïse, shown in plaster at the Paris Salon of 1853 and in marble, 1859.
François de Malherbe (1853), one of the eighty-six standing figures of famous Frenchmen in Hector Lefuel's Cour Napoléon of the Louvre Palace.
Monument of Jean Rotrou (bronze, 1866) for Dreux, adapting and simplifying the features of the famous bust by Caffieri for the foyer of the Comédie-Française.
Saint Joseph for Saint-Étienne-du-Mont, Paris.
Saint Carlo Borromeo (1867) for Saint-Étienne-du-Mont.
Rameau (marble, 1888) for the Académie nationale de musique. Shown at the Paris Salon of 1888.
Le Pêcheur (Louvre Museum).
Leucothea (Louvre Museum).

Notes

19th-century French sculptors
French male sculptors
1818 births
1903 deaths
Burials at Montmartre Cemetery
Place of birth missing
École des Beaux-Arts alumni
19th-century French male artists